King James's School is located on King James Road, Knaresborough, North Yorkshire, England. King James's is a large non-selective school with a large sixth form.

Admissions
King James's School is the only secondary school in Knaresborough and serves the town and the surrounding villages. The current Headmaster is Carl Sugden. The school is situated in the centre of the town on the main A59, next to the leisure pool. The population of Knaresborough (as well as the surrounding villages) means that it is an oversubscribed school.

History

Grammar school
The school was founded in 1616 as King James Grammar School with a charter from King James I. The school magazine The Chaloner is named after Dr Robert Chaloner who founded the school. It discusses school events and achievements for both school and its students and is published annually. It is created by the students and edited by the school's sixth form.

Comprehensive
It became a comprehensive in September 1971.

The school is newly refurbished. Major building work at the school has been completed, including a new art block with modern facilities. Annual non-compulsory school trips are available for the students.

Dr Arnold Kellett has written a book about the history of the school.

Traditions
Quid Retribuam Domino (What can I render to the Lord?) is the school motto.

Houses
King James's School has four school houses which have a colour each, Airedale – Blue, Nidderdale – Red, Swaledale – Yellow and Wharfedale – Green.

Academic performance
In 2013 the A* to B rate at A Level was 57%.  90% of students achieved 5 or more passes at GCSE; 75% including English and Maths.

Sex and Relationships Education Policy
In August 2013 the LGBT online Pink News stated that King James's School's Sex and Relationships Education Policy includes the words: "Ensure that homosexuality is not promoted as a pretended family relationship whilst not encouraging homophobia." Pink News links King James' to its reported comments by the Department for Education on the Department's own 'sex and relationship education guidance', and the British Humanist Association "concerns regarding 45 schools across the country." Pink News believes such policies, overt or vague, are a reflection of the repealed Section 28 of the 1988 Local Government Act.

Notable alumni

King James's Grammar school
 Robert Brook, CBE — former National Bus Company chief executive (1977–1986)
 David John Bowes Brown, CBE — engineer and former Multidrive chairman (1996–2004)
 Sir Albert Costain — late Conservative politician and longtime Folkestone and Hythe MP (1959–1983)
 George Andrew Hobson — late civil engineer who designed the Victoria Falls Bridge
 James "Ginger" Lacey, DFM — late Royal Air Force squadron leader credited with 28 enemy aircraft destroyed in the Battle of Britain
 Paul Stewart, FRCP — endocrinologist and medicine professor and Dean of Medicine and Health at the University of Leeds
 Nicholas Tate CBE – former chief curriculum and qualifications advisor to the Secretary of State for Education (1994–2000), former headmaster of International School of Geneva (2003–2011)
 James Turner, 1st Baron Netherthorpe — late National Farmers Union president (1945–1960)
 Timothy Wood — former Conservative MP for Stevenage (1983–1997)

King James's School
 Grant Kirkhope — video game composer and voice actor
 Jacquie O'Neill — illustrator
 Martin Clayton — Head of Prints and Drawings at the Royal Collection Trust at Windsor Castle

See also
 Dr Challoner's Grammar School

References

External links 
 
 Ofsted report
 EduBase

News items
 Secondary school teacher of the year in 2003
 Sex change in 1998

1616 establishments in England
Educational institutions established in the 1610s
Secondary schools in North Yorkshire
Knaresborough
Community schools in North Yorkshire
Training schools in England